Nicolai Vemming (born July 7, 1961 in Copenhagen, Denmark) is a Danish theatre producer and Managing Director.

Trained visual artist from Billedskolen in Copenhagen. Nicolai Vemming was producer at The Danish National School of Theatre and Contemporary Dance in Copenhagen 1989–93. In 1993, he became deputy manager and from 1998 artistic and managing director of Malmö City Theatre, Sweden. In 2001, Vemming was appointed deputy artistic director at The Royal Danish Theatre in Copenhagen and from 2004 to 2009 head of International Department. Vemming is since October 2009 managing director of Unlimited Performing Arts.

References

External links 

Danish theatre managers and producers
Living people
1961 births